The sand darters, were formerly considered to be a family the Kraemeriidae, but recent research has placed the nine species formerly classified under the Kraemeriidae as belonging to the family Gobiidae, although the researchers do not define the taxonomic status of this grouping within that family. These fish are Indo-Pacific, being native to the Indian Ocean to the central Pacific Ocean.  They live in sandy shallow pools and are found among coral.  One species is restricted to fresh waters of Madagascar.  In breeding coloration the male fish has an occelated spot at the rear of the first dorsal fin. Molecular analyses have placed the Kraemeriidae within the Gobiidae.

References 

 
Gobiiformes
Ray-finned fish families